The Young Diana is a 1918 romantic novel by the British writer Marie Corelli. A scientist develops a new rejuvenation technique that turns an older woman into a beautiful but completely heartless young woman.

Adaptation
In 1922 it was adapted into an American silent film of the same title produced by Paramount Pictures and starring Marion Davies.

References

Bibliography
 Goble, Alan. The Complete Index to Literary Sources in Film. Walter de Gruyter, 1999.

1918 British novels
Novels by Marie Corelli
British romance novels
British novels adapted into films